Jefry Corullo Canoy (born August 11, 1984), known professionally as Jeff Canoy, is a Filipino journalist and documentary filmmaker who covers conflict, natural disaster and public safety. He is a multimedia reporter, anchor and host for ABS-CBN News and Current Affairs.

Canoy is recognized as a multi-awarded Filipino journalist. In recent years, some of his wins includes a Gold World Medal (2018) and Bronze World Medal (2020) at the New York Festivals TV and Film Awards, a Gold Dolphin at the 2018 Cannes Corporate Media and TV Awards and First Prize in the English Essay category at the 2018 Carlos Palanca Memorial Awards for Literature. In 2021, Canoy was one of the winners of the Crisis Coverage Award: Top News Personalities at the 8th Paragala: The Central Luzon Media Awards.

Career 

Jeff Canoy began his career as ABS-CBN intern and production assistant in 2006. In 2007, he became a reporter assigned in the night shift covering stories on law enforcement, natural disasters, and armed conflicts. He worked for the TV documentary program Patrol ng Pilipino in 2010 and, with Atom Araullo, won the 5th Golden Screen TV Awards Outstanding News Magazine Program Host in 2014.

In  2017, Canoy replaced Atom Araullo (who transferred to GMA Network in September of that year) as  host of Red Alert, part of the Pinoy True Stories series of public affairs programs, centering on disaster preparedness and education. He was awarded the Best Public Affairs Host from the KBP Golden Dove Awards the following year while the show won Best Public Affairs Program.

In 2018, Canoy’s documentary on the Marawi siege with fellow journalist Chiara Zambrano, Di Ka Pasisiil (Never Shall Be Conquered), won the Gold World Medal at the New York Festival. The documentary also won the first Gold Dolphin Award for the Philippines in Cannes Corporate Media & TV Awards.<ref name=":2">{{Cite web|url=http://www.rappler.com/entertainment/news/213005-abs-cbn-marawi-documentary-gold-dolphin-cannes|title=ABS-CBN's Di Ka Pasisiil' wins Gold Dolphin at Cannes|last=Rappler.com|website=Rappler|language=en|access-date=2019-07-30}}</ref> The documentary also won the Creative Excellence Certificate from US International Film Festival, Best Documentary at the Gawad Tanglaw Awards and Best Documentary at the 31st PMPC Star Awards for Television.

The same year, Canoy also became a finalist for Excellence in Explanatory Writing at the Society of Publishers in Asia Awards for his multimedia piece, “Buhay Pa Kami (We Are Still Alive): Dispatches from Marawi”. Canoy also won first prize in the English Essay Category of the Carlos Palanca Memorial Awards for the same story.

In 2018, he was named a Marshall McLuhan Fellow – a journalism award conferred by the Canadian Embassy in Manila, becoming the youngest recipient of the award.

In 2019, Red Alert won another two awards at the 27th Golden Dove Awards: Best Public Service Announcement and Best Documentary Program.

In the same year, Canoy was announced as the newest host of ABS-CBN’s morning news program, Umagang Kay Ganda'' until the show's final episode on May 5, 2020.

In 2020, Canoy's documentary on people with different called “Tao Po (Is Anybody Home?)” earned the Bronze World Medal at the New York Festival. His documentary on the lone female fighter in the 1901 Balangiga encounter in the Philippine-American War titled "Ang Babae ng Balangiga" (The Woman of Balangiga) was also named a finalist.  His piece about the underlying effect of measles ("Tigdas") for "Red Alert" was also a finalist.

In the same year, Canoy was named as one of the news anchors of TeleRadyo's relaunched morning news program "Sakto".

References 

1984 births
Living people
Filipino journalists
ABS-CBN personalities
ABS-CBN News and Current Affairs people
Ateneo de Manila University alumni